Michel Akouloua is a Gabonese politician. He is a member of the Gabonese Democratic Party (Parti démocratique gabonais) (PDG), and is a Deputy of the National Assembly of Gabon in Libreville.

References

Members of the National Assembly of Gabon
Gabonese Democratic Party politicians
Living people
Year of birth missing (living people)
21st-century Gabonese people